Lennart Nilsson (born 1944) is a Swedish politician and former member of the Riksdag, the national legislature. A member of the Social Democratic Party, he represented Västra Götaland County West between October 1976 and October 2006.

References

1944 births
Living people
Members of the Riksdag 1976–1979
Members of the Riksdag 1979–1982
Members of the Riksdag 1982–1985
Members of the Riksdag 1985–1988
Members of the Riksdag 1988–1991
Members of the Riksdag 1991–1994
Members of the Riksdag 1994–1998
Members of the Riksdag 1998–2002
Members of the Riksdag 2002–2006
Members of the Riksdag from the Social Democrats